Seyidli is a village in the Agdam Rayon of Azerbaijan. Azerbaijan recaptured the village during 2020 Nagorno-Karabakh conflict. Azerbaijan Ministry of defence published video footages of the village on 23 December 2020 showing full destruction of the village during Armenian occupation.

References 

Populated places in Aghdam District